Grace College & Seminary is a private evangelical Christian college in Winona Lake, Indiana. It has six schools: The School of Arts and Sciences, The School of Behavioral Sciences, The School of Business, The School of Education, The School of Ministry Studies, and The School of Professional & Online Education (SPOE). Grace Theological Seminary, which began as the parent institution, now exists as part of the School of Ministry Studies and is also located on the Winona Lake campus. Since 2011, several commuter campuses have also started. While the college and seminary are historically affiliated with the Fellowship of Grace Brethren Churches, known as Charis Fellowship since 2018, the student body and faculty of both institutions have diverse denominational backgrounds.

History

Foundation

The institution began with the organization of Grace Theological Seminary under the leadership of Alva J. McClain in 1937. A two-year "undergraduate division" of the seminary was added in 1948 and has since transitioned into a four-year Liberal Arts college.

Presidents

Alva J. McClain served as president until 1962, when he was succeeded by his colleague and fellow co-founder Herman A. Hoyt. He remained in this position until he retired in 1976, and was followed by then Dean of Grace Theological Seminary Homer Kent, Jr., who retained this position until his own retirement in 1986. Dr. John J. Davis then served in the position from 1986 to 1993. Ronald E. Manahan replaced Davis and led the institution until 2013 at which time William J. Katip, who had been Provost since 2007, replaced Manahan. In January 2022, Dr. John Teevan replaced Katip as interim president and served until July 2022 when Dr. Drew Flamm became the seventh president. Flamm previously served as Vice President of Advancement at Grace College, a position he held since 2013. New initiatives implemented in the fall of 2013 included an adjusted calendar in which each of the semesters were divided into two 8-week sessions.

Secondary locations

Prison program

For many years Grace College maintained a ministry to the incarcerated in Indiana at various correctional facilities throughout the state directed by Dr. John Teevan. However, due to legal changes in the state of Indiana, this ministry has transitioned to a GED program. The institution now manages the GED program for five correction facilities in northern Indiana.

Commuter Schools

Since 2011, Grace College has added a satellite location in Indianapolis. This site is a commuter location that offers associates and bachelor's degree completion. It is located at 96th and Meridian on the North side of Indianapolis.They have since closed down that location, but have opened and been developing their location in Akron, Ohio.

Accreditation
In 1994, the North Central Association of Colleges and Schools accredited Grace College and Seminary, thereby joining the two previously individually accredited institutions. Its counseling program is accredited by the Council for the Accreditation of Counseling and Related Educational Programs (CACREP) and the School of Business has accreditation by the International Assembly for Collegiate Business Education (IACBE). It is also approved by the Association of Christian Schools International. Grace College's School of Education also holds separate accreditation from the National Council for Accreditation of Teacher Education (NCATE) and is recognized as a REPA Approved Teacher Preparation Program by the Indiana Department of Education

Grace Theological Seminary has separately been awarded accreditation by the Association of Theological Schools in the United States and Canada.

In August 2022, the Grace Department of Engineering was accredited by the ABET Engineering Accreditation Commission (EAC). Since May 2021, the Grace program has granted the Bachelor of Science in Mechanical Engineering (BSME) degree. Grace Engineering operates in East Hall.

Campus 

There are a total of 21 buildings on Grace College's campus. Eleven of these buildings are residence halls, with the Lancer lofts, the Lodge and Omega Hall being as the most recent additions.

Student life

College newspaper
The college newspaper, The Sounding Board, is published biweekly.

Chapel
Grace College students attend chapel sessions Tuesday, Thursday, and Friday mornings in the Manahan Orthopaedic Capital Center on campus.

Athletics
The Grace athletic teams are the Lancers. The college is a member of the National Association of Intercollegiate Athletics (NAIA), primarily competing in the Crossroads League (formerly known as the Mid-Central College Conference (MCCC) until after the 2011–12 school year) since the 1981–82 academic year; which they were a member on a previous stint from 1959–60 to 1978–79. They are also a member of the National Christian College Athletic Association (NCCAA), primarily competing as an independent in the Midwest Region of the Division I level. Across all sports, Grace has won one NAIA national championship (men's basketball), 10 NCCAA national championships, and 44 conference championships.

Grace competes in 19 intercollegiate varsity sports: Men's sports include baseball, basketball, bowling, cross country, golf, soccer, tennis and track & field; while women's sports include basketball, bowling, cross country, golf, soccer, softball, tennis, track & field and volleyball; and co-ed sports include cheerleading and eSports.

Mascot
Their students compete as "Lancers" with their mascot, Sir Red, cheering them on.

Basketball
Grace's men's basketball program was coached by Jim Kessler for 42 seasons from 1977-2019 and won the NAIA Division II men's championship in 1992, and in 2013, advanced to the Final Four. On 31 October 2014, Coach Kessler achieved his 700th career coaching win. Since 2019, Grace has been led by Coach Scott Moore, a former Grace player and long time assistant coach. The 2021-2022 began a run of great success for the program as Grace captured the Crossroads League tournament title and made a run to the Sweet 16 of the NAIA tournament, which included an upset of #2 seed Olivet Nazarene. The 2022-2023 men's basketball team got off to the best start in program history and captured the Crossroads League regular season and conference tournament title and ended the season with a 31-4 record and an appearance in the quarterfinals of the NAIA tournament. 

The women's basketball team has been led by Coach Dan Davis since 2018 and the 2022-23 season produced the best season in program history.

See also
Louis S. Bauman
John C. Whitcomb
Louie Giglio
Billy Sunday Home, a museum associated with Grace College & Seminary

References

External links
 
 Official athletics website

Seminaries and theological colleges in Indiana
Evangelical seminaries and theological colleges in the United States
Private universities and colleges in Indiana
Educational institutions established in 1948
Buildings and structures in Kosciusko County, Indiana
Education in Kosciusko County, Indiana
1948 establishments in Indiana
Evangelicalism in Indiana
Council for Christian Colleges and Universities